State Route 205 (SR 205) is a north–south state highway in the central part of the U.S. state of Ohio. The southern terminus of SR 205 is at a four-way stop intersection in the village of Danville where it meets U.S. Route 62 (US 62). The junction also doubles as the southern terminus of SR 514, which runs concurrently with SR 205 for approximately  heading north from there.

Route description
Located entirely within the northeastern quadrant of Knox County, there is no portion of SR 205 that is inclusive within the National Highway System.

History
SR 205 was established in 1924. It has maintained the same northeastern Knox County alignment from its inception to this day.; no major changes have taken place to the highway since its designation.

Major intersections

References

205
Transportation in Knox County, Ohio